"Raising My Family" is a song by South African singer Steve Kekana that was released as a non-album single in 1980. The song was co-written and produced by Mally Watson and Tom Vuma. The song reached the top 10 in Sweden, peaking at No. 3 in October 1981, and remained on the chart for seven weeks. It also reached the top 10 in Switzerland and Austria, peaking at No. 7 and No. 3, respectively.

Track listing and formats 

 South African 7-inch single

A. "Raising My Family" – 3:53
B. "Working Man" – 3:42

Charts

References 

1980 songs
1980 singles
EMI Records singles
Number-one singles in Finland
Steve Kekana songs